Metro Busway (previously known as Metro Liner and Metro Transitway) is a system of bus rapid transit (BRT) routes that operate primarily along exclusive or semi-exclusive roadways known locally as a busway or transitway. There are currently two lines in the system, the G Line in the San Fernando Valley, and the J Line between El Monte, Downtown Los Angeles and Gardena, with some trips continuing to San Pedro. The Los Angeles County Metropolitan Transportation Authority (Metro) operates the system.

The G Line, which runs along an exclusive busway, was the first route in the system to open on October 29, 2005. The J Line opened on December 13, 2009, utilizing the pre-existing Harbor Transitway and El Monte Busway, semi-exclusive roadways that are used by both buses and as high-occupancy toll lanes.

Metro Busway routes are designed to mimic Metro Rail services, in both the vehicles' design and their operation. Buses on both lines use a silver livery (similar to the one used on Metro Rail), passengers can board at any door, and vehicles receive priority at intersections. Like Metro Rail, Metro Busway operates on a proof-of-payment honor system, and passengers who have a fare loaded on a TAP card can board from any door. TAP cards can be purchased at vending machines located at stations.

System

Lines
Metro Busway lines are named as part of the naming scheme used for Metro Rail lines, however, the colored icons for the Metro Busway lines are squares instead of the circles used for Metro Rail lines.

Two Metro Busway lines operate in Los Angeles County:

Corridors

These services operate on three primary corridors (in addition to city streets, where necessary):
 G Line Busway
 El Monte Busway
 Harbor Transitway/Harbor Freeway

History

The first busway in the Los Angeles area was the El Monte Busway which opened in January 1973 and ran parallel to Interstate 10 (San Bernardino Freeway), offering an 18-minute trip between El Monte and Downtown Los Angeles, compared to 35–45 minutes in the general-purpose lanes. The facility was a success with about 32,000 boardings per day on lines that used the busway as of November 2000.

The area's second busway, the Harbor Transitway opened in 1996 offering a new connection between Gardena and Downtown Los Angeles. Ridership on the Harbor Transitway was radically lower than expected: Caltrans had projected that 65,200 passengers would travel along the Harbor Transitway each day, but after 10 years, the facility had only attracted 3,000 passengers per weekday.

A third busway to be built in the region came after community revolt against a proposed light rail line. The Los Angeles County Metropolitan Transportation Authority (Metro) acquired the Southern Pacific Burbank Branch right of way intending to utilize the corridor for light rail trains. Neighbors successfully petitioned lawmakers to pass a ban on utilizing transit tax revenue for anything other than an extension of the existing subway into the San Fernando Valley. However, the passage of Proposition A in 1998 cut off funding for any subway projects. With both subway and light rail now legally prohibited, but with growing political pressure to utilize the former railbed, the last available option was a dedicated busway. This proposal was also opposed by neighborhood groups; however, since the previous law did not prohibit it, it moved forward. The busway opened as the Orange Line (now G Line) on October 29, 2005. The line was a success, attracting nearly 23,000 boardings per day in the first year it was open, and nearly 30,000 boardings per day by 2013. The line is so popular, that in 2014 users petitioned lawmakers to repeal the ban on light rail, and Metro now plans to convert the busway to light rail by 2050.

After the successful launch of the busway in the San Fernando Valley, Metro decided to rebrand the county's other busways in an attempt to increase awareness. In March 2006, Metro decided that the Harbor Transitway would be colored bronze and the El Monte Busway would be colored silver on Metro's maps and the two would be marketed as a "Combined Transitway Service." No changes were made in the operations of the bus routes operated on either facility. The changes were criticized as being difficult to understand for irregular and new riders.

In 2009, Metro returned to plan it first proposed in 1993 and created a new bus rapid transit service called the Silver Line (now J Line) utilizing both the Harbor Transitway and the El Monte Busway. The new higher frequency service would be funded by converting both corridors into high occupancy toll (HOT) lanes, to be branded as the Metro ExpressLanes. The bus route began operations on December 13, 2009. Since the J Line's start, Metro has refurbished the aging stations along both the Harbor Transitway and the El Monte Busway, bringing them closer to the amenities provided along the G Line's busway. The plan has led to higher ridership along the corridor, especially along the Harbor Transitway.

On June 30, 2012, the busway used by the G Line buses was extended northward to the Chatsworth Metrolink station, continuing to follow the former Southern Pacific Burbank Branch right-of-way owned by Metro.

Route names referring to colors were changed to letters in 2020, with the Orange Line becoming the G Line and the Silver Line becoming the J Line.

The following table shows the timeline of BRT expansions:

Notes:

Future 
Metro plans to add additional Metro Busway lines; some projects may have their timelines accelerated under its Twenty-eight by '28 initiative.

On March 17, 2021, Metro staff came forward with five corridors that the agency could pursue to have Bus Rapid Transit implemented in them.

See also

List of Los Angeles Metro Busway stations

References

 
2005 establishments in California